3/11 may refer to:

 March 11, in month-day date notation
 3 November, in day-month date notation
 3rd Battalion, 11th Marines
 March, 11 A.D.; see AD 11
 November, 3 A.D.; see AD 3
 2011 Tōhoku earthquake and tsunami
 Fukushima Daiichi nuclear disaster, caused by the earthquake and tsunami
 2004 Madrid train bombings

See also
 311 (disambiguation)
 Windows 3.11